Harold Holzer (born February 5, 1949) is a scholar of Abraham Lincoln and the political culture of the American Civil War Era. He serves as director of Hunter College's Roosevelt House Public Policy Institute. Holzer previously spent twenty-three years as senior vice president for public affairs at The Metropolitan Museum of Art in New York before retiring in 2015.

Early life and education
Holzer was born on February 5, 1949, in Queens, New York to Charles and Rose Holzer, a construction contractor and homemaker, respectively. He attended Queens College of the City University of New York where he earned a bachelor of arts in 1969. Holzer married Edith Spiegel, a writer/publicist, in 1971. They had two children, Remy and Meg. Holzer is Jewish.

Career
Holzer began his career as a newspaper reporter and then editor of The Manhattan Tribune. He then served as press secretary to Congresswoman Bella S. Abzug (both on Capitol Hill and in campaigns for the U.S. Senate and mayor of New York), press secretary to 1977 mayoral candidate Mario Cuomo, a government speechwriter for New York City Mayor Abraham D. Beame, and for six years as public affairs director for WNET. From 1984 through 1992 Holzer worked in the administration of Governor Mario Cuomo (with whom he co-edited the 1990 book, Lincoln on Democracy).

In 1992, Holzer joined The Metropolitan Museum of Art in New York as chief communications officer. He was elevated to vice president in 1996 and senior vice president for public affairs in 2005 with responsibilities over government affairs, multi-cultural development, admissions, and visitor services. He remains a trustee of The Metropolitan Museum representing the New York City Comptroller. Since 2015, Holzer has served as director of Hunter College's Roosevelt House Public Policy Institute.

History and Lincoln scholarship
In his work as a historian Holzer has authored, co-authored, and edited more than 52 books, and contributed more than 550 articles to magazines and journals, plus chapters and forewords for 60 additional books. Many of his works have received awards, including the Gilder Lehrman Lincoln Prize and four other awards in 2015 for his book Lincoln and the Power of the Press.

Holzer served for nine years as co-chairman of the United States Abraham Lincoln Bicentennial Commission (ALBC), appointed to the commission by President Bill Clinton in 2000 and elected co-chair by his fellow commissioners. In June 2010, he was elected chairman of the ALBC's successor organization, The Abraham Lincoln Bicentennial Foundation, which he led through 2016. Holzer has served as president of the Lincoln Group of New York, on the board of directors of the Abraham Lincoln Association and New York's Civil War Round Table, and on the editorial advisory boards of The Lincoln Herald, American Heritage, and Civil War Times. He was the founding vice chairman of The Lincoln Forum and currently serves as chairman. From 2012 to 2015, Holzer served as a Roger Hertog Fellow at the New-York Historical Society. In 2016-17 he served as Distinguished Visiting Scholar at The Zahava and Moshael Straus Center for Torah and Western Thought at Yeshiva University. He was also a script consultant to the Steven Spielberg film, Lincoln, and wrote the official young readers' companion book to the movie.

A frequent guest on television, Holzer has appeared on C-SPAN's Washington Journal and its 2009 documentary special on The White House. He has also appeared on The History Channel, PBS, The Today Show, Bill Moyers Journal, CBS Sunday Morning, Morning Joe, The Lou Dobbs Show, History Detectives, and The Charlie Rose Show. C-SPAN has broadcast Holzer's stage presentation "Lincoln Seen and Heard" with Sam Waterston and "Grant Seen and Heard" with Richard Dreyfuss among many others. In February 2005, President and Mrs. Bush hosted a special Lincoln's birthday-eve performance of "Lincoln Seen and Heard" with Holzer and Waterston, telecast live from the White House. During the Lincoln bicentennial, he appeared on such documentaries as "Stealing Lincoln's Body," "The Lincoln Assassination," "Looking for Lincoln," and "Lincoln: American Mastermind."  Holzer is featured in Sean Conant's documentary film, The Gettysburg Address, alongside Matthew Broderick, Laura Bush, and Tom Brokaw.

Holzer also lectures throughout the country, and has curated seven museum exhibitions, including three shows of Lincoln art at the former Lincoln Museum in Fort Wayne, Indiana. He served as chief historian for the exhibition "Lincoln and New York" at the New-York Historical Society, October 2009-March 2010, and "Lincoln and The Jews," March–June 2015, also at the New-York Historical Society. He also co-organized "The First Step to Freedom," a multicity, sesquicentennial exhibition of Lincoln's original Preliminary Emancipation Proclamation, which debuted at the Schomburg Library in Harlem on September 22, 2012. He has performed, throughout the nation, stage programs entitled "Lincoln Seen and Heard," "The Lincoln Family Album," "Lincoln in American Memory," and "Grant Seen and Heard"—combining period pictures with authentic words—with such actors as Sam Waterston, Liam Neeson, Richard Dreyfuss, Stephen Lang, Holly Hunter, André De Shields, Anna Deavere Smith, Annette Bening, Alec Baldwin, F. Murray Abraham, and Dianne Wiest. His most recent programs are "The Real Lincoln-Douglas Debates" with Norm Lewis and Stephen Lang, performed at The Metropolitan Museum of Art and telecast on C-SPAN; and "Lincoln's Shakespeare" with Waterston, Lang, Kathleen Chalfant, Fritz Weaver, and John Douglas Thompson and performed in 2013 and 2014 at The Century Association and The Berkshire Playhouse. Holzer's programs have been staged at such venues as the White House, the George H. W. Bush Presidential Library, the William J. Clinton Presidential Library, Lincoln Center in New York, The Metropolitan Museum of Art, the Library of Congress, the Lincoln Association of Los Angeles, The Lincoln Forum at Gettysburg, Ford's Theatre, site of the Lincoln assassination, and the U.S. Capitol.

Awards
In 2008, Holzer received the National Humanities Medal from President Bush and The Lincoln Medal of Honor from the Lincoln Society of Springfield, Illinois, the state's highest honor. He also won a second-place 2005 Lincoln Prize (for Lincoln at Cooper Union). For his 2008 book Lincoln President-Elect, Holzer received awards from The Lincoln Group of New York, The Civil War Round Table of New York, and The Illinois State Historical Society. His young readers' book, Father Abraham: Lincoln and His Sons, won the first James Robertson Jr. Award for Civil War Children's Literature from The Civil War Round Table of New York. He has also won lifetime achievement awards from The Civil War Round Tables of New York, Chicago, and Kansas City, and from Lincoln groups in Washington and New York. He won the DAR History Award Medal in 2012. In 2013, he wrote the Lincoln-Emancipation essay for the official program for the re-inauguration of President Barack Obama. Holzer's book Lincoln and the Power of the Press: The War for Public Opinion won not only the Lincoln Prize but also the Mark Lynton History Prize from the Columbia University School of Journalism, the Goldsmith Book Prize from The Shorenstein Center on Media, Politics, and Public Policy at Harvard's Kennedy School, and The Hazel Dicken-Garcia Award for Distinguished Scholarship in Journalism History. In 2015, Holzer received The Lincoln Forum's Richard Nelson Current Award of Achievement. In 2023, he was awarded the Augustus Saint-Gaudens Medal.

Works
 1984: The Lincoln Image: Abraham Lincoln and the Popular Print with Mark E. Neely, Jr. and Gabor S. Boritt
 1985: Changing the Lincoln Image with Neely and Boritt
 1987: The Confederate Image: Prints of the Lost Cause with Neely and Boritt
 1990: Lincoln on Democracy, co-edited with Mario M. Cuomo)
 1990: The Lincoln Family Album with Neely
 1993: Mine Eyes Have Seen the Glory: The Civil War in Art with Neely
 1993: The Lincoln-Douglas Debates: The First Complete, Unexpurgated Text
 1993: Washington and Lincoln Portrayed: National Icons in Popular Prints
 1993: Dear Mr. Lincoln: Letters to the President
 1996: Witness to War
 1996: The Civil War Era
 1998: The Lincoln Mailbag: America Writes to the President
 1999: The Union Preserved with Daniel Lorello
 1999: The Lincoln Forum: Abraham Lincoln, Gettysburg, and the Civil War (co-edited with John Y. Simon and William Pederson)
 1999: Lincoln as I Knew Him: Gossip, Tributes, and Revelations from His Best Friends and Worst Enemies
 2000: The Union Image: Prints of the Civil War North with Neely
 2000: Lincoln Seen and Heard
 2000: Abraham Lincoln, The Writer (named to the Children's Literature Choice List, and the Bank Street "Best Children's Books of the Year")
 2001: Prang's Civil War Pictures: The Complete Battle Chromos of Louis Prang
 2002: State of the Union: New York and the Civil War
 2002: The Lincoln Forum: Rediscovering Abraham Lincoln (co-edited with John Y. Simon)
 2004: The President is Shot! The Assassination of Abraham Lincoln
 2004: Lincoln at Cooper Union: The Speech That Made Abraham Lincoln President
 2005: Lincoln in the Times: The Life of Abraham Lincoln as Originally Reported in the New York Times (co-edited with David Herbert Donald, St. Martin's Press)
 2006: The Battle of Hampton Roads (co-edited with Tim Mulligan)
 2006: The Emancipation Proclamation: Three Views, with Edna Greene Medford and Frank J. Williams
 2006: Lincoln Portrayed: In the Collections of the Indiana Historical Society
 2007: Abraham Lincoln Revisited (co-edited with Simon and Dawn Vogel)
 2007: Lincoln and Freedom: Slavery, Emancipation, and the Thirteenth Amendment (co-edited with Sarah Vaughn Gabbard)
 2007: Lincoln's White House Secretary: The Adventurous Life of William O. Stoddard
 2008: Lincoln President-Elect: Abraham Lincoln and the Great Secession Winter, 1860-1861
 2009: The Lincoln Anthology: Great Writers on His Life and Legacy from 1860 to Now
 2009: In Lincoln's Hand: His Original Manuscripts with Commentary by Distinguished Americans.
 2009: The Lincoln Assassination Conspirators: Their Confinement and Execution, as Recorded in the Letterbook of John Frederick Hartranft (co-edited with Edward Steers, Jr.)
 2009: Lincoln and New York
 2010: The Lincoln Assassination: Crime & Punishment, Myth & Memory (co-edited with Craig L. Symonds and Frank J. Williams)
 2010: The New York Times Civil War (co-edited with Craig L. Symonds with an introduction by President Bill Clinton)
 2011: Father Abraham: Lincoln and His Sons
 2011: Lincoln on War
 2011: Hearts Touched by Fire: The Best of Battles and Leaders of the Civil War
 2011: The Living Lincoln (co-edited with Thomas A. Horrocks and Frank J. Williams)
 2012: Emancipating Lincoln: The Proclamation in Text, Context, and Memory 2012: Lincoln: How Abraham Lincoln Ended Slavery in America 2013: Abraham Lincoln, Defender of Freedom (editor)
 2013: 1863: Lincoln's Pivotal Year (co-edited with Sara Gabbard)
 2013: The Civil War in 50 Objects 2014: Lincoln and the Power of the Press: The War for Public Opinion 2015: President Lincoln Assassinated!!: The Firsthand Story of the Murder, Manhunt, Trial, and Mourning, Compiled and Introduced by Harold Holzer
 2015: Exploring Lincoln: Great Historians Reappraise Our Greatest President (co-edited with Craig L. Symonds and Frank J. Williams)
 2015: 1865: America Makes War and Peace in Lincoln's Final Year 2015: A Just and Generous Nation: Abraham Lincoln and the Fight for American Opportunity (with Norton Garfinkle)
 2016: The Annotated Lincoln (co-edited with Thomas Horrocks)
 2019: Monument Man: The Life and Art of Daniel Chester French 2020: The Presidents vs. the Press: The Endless Battle between the White House and the Media—from the Founding Fathers to Fake NewsHonors
 1984, 1990, 1993, 2005, 2009, 2015: Barondess Award of the Civil War Round Table of New York
 1988: Diploma of Honor from Lincoln Memorial University
 1988, 1993, 2004, 2009: Award of Achievement from the Lincoln Group of New York
 1988: George Washington Medal from the Freedom Foundation
 1989: Writer of Distinction Award from the International Reading Association
 1992: Honorary Doctorate in Humane Letters from Lincoln College
 1993: Award of Superior Achievement from the Illinois State Historical Society
 1996: Manuscript Society of America award for Dear Mr. Lincoln 2000: Newman Book Award of the American Historical Print Collectors Society for The Union Image 2002: Nevins-Freeman Award of The Civil War Round Table of Chicago
 2006: Honorary degrees by Illinois College and University of Massachusetts Dartmouth
 2006: The Lincoln Group of The District of Columbia's annual award of achievement
 2008: The Bell I. Wiley Prize for Lifetime Achievement from the Civil War Round Table of NY
 2008: The National Humanities Medal from President George W. Bush
 2009: Honorary Degree (Doctor of Humane Letters) from Bard College
 2009: President's Medal from Queens College, CUNY
 2009: Inducted as a Laureate of The Lincoln Academy of Illinois and awarded the Order of Lincoln (the State’s highest honor) by the Governor of Illinois in 2009 Bicentennial Laureate.
 2010: Lincoln Medal of Honor, Lincoln Society, Springfield, Illinois
 2010: Awards for Lincoln and New York exhibition from The Civil War Round Table of New York, The Lincoln Group of New York, and The Victorian Society.
 2010: Barondess Award, The Civil War Round Table of New York, for Lincoln President-Elect''
 2011: James Robertson Jr. Award for Civil War Children's Literature, Civil War Round Table of New York
 2012: DAR History Award Medal
 2012: Honorary Degree (Doctor of Humane Letters), Centre College, Danville, KY
 2015: Lincoln Group of New York Achievement Award
 2015: Harry S. Truman Award from The Civil War Round Table of Kansas City
 2015: Gilder Lehrman Lincoln Prize
 2015: Hazel Dicken-Garcia Award for Distinguished Contributions to Journalism History
 2015: Mark Lynton History Prize, Columbia University School of Journalism
 2015: Goldsmith Prize from The Shorenstein Center on Media, Politics, and Public Policy, Kennedy School at Harvard University
 2015: Boyd County High School chapter of the Rho Kappa National Social Studies Honor Society named Harold Holzer Scholar Award in Holzer's honor.

References

External links
 Official Site of Harold Holzer
 Abraham Lincoln Bicentennial Commission
 
 Booknotes interview with Holzer on The Lincoln-Douglas Debates, August 22, 1993.
 In Depth interview with Holzer, June 6, 2004
 C-SPAN Q&A interview with Holzer on Lincoln President-Elect: Abraham Lincoln and the Great Secession Winter, 1860-1861, November 9, 2008

1949 births
Abraham Lincoln
American marketing people
American public relations people
Historians of Abraham Lincoln
Historians of the American Civil War
Living people
National Humanities Medal recipients
New York (state) Democrats
Lincoln Prize winners